Interboro High School is a high school located in Prospect Park, Pennsylvania, part of the Philadelphia metropolitan area.

As the sole high school in the Interboro School District, students from surrounding communities Glenolden, Norwood, Prospect Park itself, and the two towns of Tinicum Township (Lester and Essington) attend grade levels 9-12 here.

The school district's school bus system is headquartered at the high school, as is "ITV," a television studio broadcasting to all cable-ready homes in the district.

As of the 2018–2019 school year, IHS has a student body of 1,086.

Notable alumni 
Vince Papale, American football wide receiver

References

External links

Interboro High School website

Public high schools in Pennsylvania
Schools in Delaware County, Pennsylvania